Oxford City Football Club is a semi-professional English association football club based in Marston, Oxford. They currently compete in the National League South, the sixth tier of English football, and play their home matches at Marsh Lane.

History
The club played their first recorded match on 15 March 1884 at Thame Grammar School, losing 4–2.  Fixtures were irregular for over a decade, with none at all played between 1886 and 1893, but the club was reorganised and reconstituted in 1897 and soon became the leading club in Oxfordshire, winning the FA Amateur Cup in 1906, before joining the Isthmian League the following year.

In the latter half of the 20th century, the club went into decline and soon fell behind Headington United after that club turned professional in 1949. An attempt was made to return the club to success in 1979 when it became a limited company and later when the legendary Bobby Moore was appointed manager with his former West Ham United team-mate Harry Redknapp as his assistant.

The club reached its lowest point in 1988 when they were evicted from their White House Ground by their landlords Brasenose College, who sold it off for housing. Forced to resign from the Isthmian League, the club did not reform and return to senior football until 1990 when, based at Cutteslowe Park, they entered the South Midlands League Division One, winning promotion in their first season. They returned to the Isthmian League in 1993 when they also moved to their current ground. The club continued to climb through the divisions of that League during the 1990s and reached the final of the FA Vase in 1995.

Highlights of the next decade included two years in the Isthmian League Premier Division and an epic FA Cup run in 1999–2000 which culminated in a three-game battle against Wycombe Wanderers in the First Round proper, eventually being edged out 1–0 at Oxford United's Manor Ground. The first replay had been abandoned because of a fire alarm just as the penalty shootout was about to start; this remains the only FA Cup tie to go to a second replay since the FA ruled that all ties should be settled after a maximum of two games. This rule change also means that City's other FA Cup record – the six games needed before losing to Alvechurch in 1971–72 – will probably never be beaten.

In 2005 the club were relegated back to the Spartan South Midlands League, but were promoted at the first time of asking under manager Andy Lyne, winning both the Championship and the Premier Cup.

In November 2006 Lyne resigned as manager to become the club's Director of Football. He was succeeded by Justin Merritt as Player Manager with former Oxford United player Mike Ford as his assistant. Merritt subsequently stepped down in August 2009 and Ford took over as manager.

On 3 May 2008, Oxford City were promoted from the Southern League Division One South and West with a 1–0 win over Uxbridge. In their first season in the Premier Division they finished in 6th place, narrowly missing out on the playoffs.

In 2011–12 Oxford City finished 2nd after narrowly missing out on the title. They won the playoff final against AFC Totton to gain promotion to Conference North for the first time in their history. The club enjoyed a successful first season in the Conference North, finishing in 10th place, 11 points clear of the relegation zone. The following season proved more of a struggle, with the club initially finishing in the relegation zone after a three-point deduction for fielding an ineligible player, only to be reprieved from relegation after Vauxhall Motors resigned from the Football Conference. Mike Ford left the club shortly after the season ended.

On 18 May 2014, Oxford City appointed Justin Merritt as Manager; he was joined by his Assistant Danny Nicholls with coaching roles for former players Mark Jones and Alan Foster and Enrique Guillen continuing his coaching role at the club. For 2015–16, they moved from Conference North to Conference South – the division was renamed National League South. Merritt resigned in December 2016, becoming the club's general manager, and Mark Jones took over as first team coach, initially on a caretaker basis.

In 2017–18 the Hoops enjoyed a historic run in the FA Cup. Under the guidance of Mark Jones, City knocked out  football league opposition for the first time in their history with a 1–0 victory away at Colchester. Then, on their first appearance in the second round  for 47 years, the club were narrowly defeated with an injury-time goal by Notts County, in a game broadcast live on BT Sport. Good form in the cup competitions followed with victory in the Oxfordshire Senior Cup final for the first time in 15 years at the close of the season. 

City's cup success continued in 2018–19, when they reached the First Round proper of the FA Cup for the second consecutive season. After a 3–3 draw away to League 2 Tranmere Rovers, the club were knocked out in the replay in front of the BT Sport TV cameras at Marsh Lane. The Hoops also retained the Oxfordshire Senior Cup, coming from 3–1 down to defeat Banbury United 4–3 in a thrilling final. The 2020–21 season saw them knock out another league team from the FA Cup, Northampton.

In October 2019 Mark Jones left his role as manager by 'mutual consent', just 48 hours after guiding the team into the FA Cup first round for the third year in succession. Former players Justin Merritt and Andy Ballard took over as the interim management team.

City are an FA Charter Standard Community Club and field more than 37 teams, with sides for men, women, boys and girls.

Ground

Oxford City play their home games at Marsh Lane, Marston, Oxford, Oxfordshire, OX3 0NQ.

Players

Current squad

Club staff

Honours
Oxfordshire Senior Cup:
Winners (36): including one shared with Witney Town
Tournoi de Pâques du Stade Français
Winners (1): 1921

Club records
Best league performance: second in Southern League Premier Division 2011–12, Playoff winners
Best league performance: second in Isthmian League, 1934–35 and 1945–46
Highest league finish: 5th in National League South, 2021–22
Best FA Cup performance: Second Round Proper, 1969–70, 2017–18 and 2020–21
Best FA Amateur Cup performance: Winners, 1905–06
Best FA Trophy performance: Quarter-Final, 2020–21
Best FA Vase performance: Final, 1994–95
Record attendance: 2,276 v Oxford United, 8 July 2017 – pre-season friendly for opening of new 3G pitch
Record competitive attendance: 1,349 v Eastbourne Borough, 11 May 2022 – National League South Play-Off Eliminator

Average attendances

17/21 home games were played in 2019–20

References

External links

Official website
Unofficial Fans Forum

Southern Football League clubs
City F.C.
City F.C.
Association football clubs established in 1882
Football clubs in Oxfordshire
Isthmian League
National League (English football) clubs
1882 establishments in England
Football clubs in England
Oxford City F.C.